Langenaltheim is a municipality in the Middle Franconian district of Weißenburg-Gunzenhausen in Germany.

References

Weißenburg-Gunzenhausen